Walter Woodbury may refer to:
 Walter B. Woodbury, English inventor and photographer
 J. Walter Woodbury, American biologist